Modesto City School District is a public school district based in Stanislaus County, California, United States, with an enrollment of approximately 32,000 students. Founded in 1871, the district consists of an elementary district and a high school district with a common administration. Seven other elementary school districts, Empire Union, Hart-Ransom Union, Paradise, Salida Union, Shiloh, Stanislaus Union, and Sylvan Union, feed into Modesto City Schools at the high school level.

The district comprises 22 elementary schools (grades K–6), 4 middle schools (grades 7–8), 9 high schools (grades 9–12), and an alternative-education program.

Boundary
In addition to Modesto, Modesto City Schools also serve sections of Ceres and Riverbank and the CDPs of Airport, Bret Harte, Bystrom, Del Rio, Empire, Riverdale Park, Rouse, Salida and West Modesto.

Schools

High schools
 Fred C. Beyer High School
 Grace M. Davis High School
 Thomas Downey High School
 James C. Enochs High School
 Joseph A. Gregori High School
 Peter Johansen High School
 Modesto High School
 Elliott Alternative Education Center

Middle schools
* Evelyn Hanshaw Middle School
 La Loma Junior High School
 Mark Twain Junior High School
 Roosevelt Junior High School
 Daniel J. Savage Middle School
 Elizabeth Ustach Middle School
 Somerset Middle School

Elementary schools
 Elihu Beard Elementary School
 Bret Harte Elementary School
 Burbank Elementary School
 El Vista Elementary School
 Enslen Elementary School
 Catherine Everett Elementary School
 Fairview Elementary School
 Franklin Elementary School
 John Fremont Elementary School
 William Garrison Elementary School
 Kirschen Elementary School
 Lakewood Elementary School
 James Marshall Elementary School
 Alberta Martone Elementary School
 John Muir Elementary School
 Robertson Road Elementary School
 Rose Avenue Elementary School
 Shackelford Elementary School 
 Sonoma Elementary School
 Tuolumne Elementary School
 Wilson Elementary School
 Orville Wright Elementary School
 Freedom Elementary School
 Orchard Elementary School
 CF Brown Elementary School
 Standiford Elementary School
 Sherwood Elementary School

Adult/alternative
 Elliott Alternative Programs
 Elliott Continuation School

References

External links
 

School districts in Stanislaus County, California